Astrothelium variabile is a species of corticolous (bark-dwelling) lichen in the family Trypetheliaceae. Found in Bolivia, it was formally described as a new species in 2016 by lichenologists Adam Flakus and André Aptroot. It is only known to occur in this type of habitat in Bolivia. The species epithet variabile alludes to the variable amounts of lichexanthone in different regions of the thallus. This is a lichen product that causes parts of the lichen to fluoresce when lit with a long-wavelength UV light. Astrothelium ochroleucoides is somewhat similar in external appearance, but it has smaller ascospores than A. variabile.

References

variabile
Lichen species
Lichens described in 2016
Lichens of Bolivia
Taxa named by André Aptroot
Taxa named by Adam Grzegorz Flakus